C. aurea  may refer to:
 Calamagrostis aurea, a grass species found only in Ecuador
 Calpurnia aurea, a tree species found in Southern Africa
 Calytrix aurea, a shrub species endemic to the south-west of Western Australia
 Canalispira aurea, a very small sea snail species
 Carex aurea, the golden sedge, a plant species native to much of North America
 Cattleya aurea, the golden yellow cattleya, an orchid species
 Chysis aurea, an orchid species
 Clathrina aurea, a sponge species
 Corydalis aurea, the scrambled eggs, golden corydalis, golden smoke, a medicinal and poisonous plant species native to North America

See also
 Aurea (disambiguation)